Point May is the most southerly community on the Burin Peninsula in Newfoundland and Labrador with a population of 254 in 2021. It is a Catholic community with a church, town hall, fire hall, softball and soccer field. It is known for its close proximity, to the French islands  of St. Pierre and Miquelon, where the smuggling of liquor and tobacco has been a way of life since before Canada was a country.

Demographics 

See also 
Lamaline
Newfoundland outport

References

Fishing communities in Canada
Towns in Newfoundland and Labrador